Cabeceras is a Chilean hamlet (caserío) located in Paredones, Cardenal Caro Province.

In 1899, as published on Diccionario Geográfico de la República de Chile by Francisco Solano Asta-Buruaga y Cienfuegos, the hamlet had 470 inhabitants. It is located northwest of then-village Paredones, near the lagoon of Bucalemu.

References

Populated places in Cardenal Caro Province